Urban Feel is an Israeli film released in 1998. It tells the story of Eva and Robbie (played by Dafna Rechter and Sharon Alexander), a young Tel Aviv couple in a troubled marriage, which is rocked by the return of Emmanuel - played by Jonathan Sagall - Eva's charming and mischievous ex-boyfriend. 

It won Best Feature Film at the 1998 Haifa International Film Festival, and was nominated for twelve Israeli Academy Awards, winning two. It was also entered into the 49th Berlin International Film Festival.

Cast
 Dafna Rechter as Eva
 Jonathan Sagall as Emanuel
 Shimon Ben-Ari as Marco
 Tchia Danon as Gabriela
 Ziv Baruch as Jonah
 Zachi Dichner as Police officer

References

External links

1998 films
1998 drama films
Films set in Tel Aviv
1990s Hebrew-language films
Films directed by Jonathan Sagall
Israeli drama films